Gerald Randolph Opsima Anderson Jr. (born March 7, 1989) is a Filipino-American actor. He is managed and under contract to Star Magic, ABS-CBN's home based talent agency.

Recognized as the "Action-Drama Prince" of Philippine industry, He is one of the most bankable leading men of his generation. Anderson is best known for his lead roles in a series of hit television shows such as Sana Maulit Muli (2007), My Girl (2008), action dramas, Tayong Dalawa (2009) in which he plays a soldier, and an NBI Agent in Kung Tayo'y Magkakalayo (2010), a mentally challenged young man in Budoy (2011–2012), in the TV adaptation of the iconic comics character "Fredo" in Mars Ravelo's Dyesebel (2014), the Fantasy drama, Nathaniel (2015) and in the Cannes Film Festival Director's Fortnight entry On the Job (2013).

Biography
Anderson was born on March 7, 1989, in Subic, Zambales, Philippines. His father is an American instructor in the Subic Naval Base who travels back and forth between the United States and Zambales while his mother is a Filipina businesswoman from General Santos, Philippines. He also has a younger brother (Kenneth Anderson) and two older sisters from his mother's first marriage.
When he was three years old, he and his family moved from General Santos to San Antonio, Texas, and then to Springfield, Missouri, when he was six. Finally, at 14 years of age, his family moved back to General Santos.

Anderson demonstrates oral fluency in English, Tagalog, and Cebuano. He finished his elementary studies in San Antonio, Texas, and completed high school in General Santos, Philippines.

Acting career (2006–present)

Anderson was discovered by Joross Gamboa when Gamboa performed in Anderson's hometown. Gamboa introduced him to his manager, Jhun Reyes, who brought him to ABS-CBN for the first season of Pinoy Big Brother: Teen Edition.
Anderson and the other housemates entered the Big Brother house on April 23, 2006. After 42 days, he was named Teen Third Big Placer on the show.

Six months later, Anderson and screen partner/then-girlfriend, actress Kim Chiu, appeared together on several ABS-CBN shows (including Love Spell and Aalog-Alog) and in the film First Day High. In 2007 Anderson and Chiu starred in their first primetime TV series, Sana Maulit Muli; in September of that year they appeared in their first feature film, I've Fallen For You, produced by Star Cinema. That year, he was the Best New Male TV Personality (for Sana Maulit Muli) at the 21st PMPC Star Awards and the 38th Guillermo Mendoza Memorial Scholarship Foundation Box Office Awards (with Chiu). In May 2008 Anderson and Chiu were cast in My Girl, an adaptation of the South Korean TV series.

In 2009, Anderson starred in the primetime drama series Tayong Dalawa, winning the Best Drama Actor award at the NSUU TV Awards; Anderson and Chiu were the Most Popular Loveteam for the third consecutive year at the Guillermo Mendoza Memorial Scholarship Foundation Box Office Awards. In August of that year, he appeared in Agimat: Ang Mga Alamat ni Ramon Revilla:Tiagong Akyat.

The following year, Anderson started with Kim Chiu in the film Paano Na Kaya. He was cast in the ABS-CBN primetime drama Kung Tayo'y Magkakalayo, and appeared in Your Song Presents: Isla with his Pinoy Big Brother Unlimited former housemates. Anderson and Chiu teamed up again in October 2010 for the film Till My Heartaches End. That month, it was reported that the couple had ended their romantic relationship.

By the end of December 2010, Anderson announced his departure from Bench following his decision not to renew his contract due to busy commitments.

In 2011 Anderson first worked with Sarah Geronimo in a film collaboration with Star Cinema and Viva Films entitled Catch Me, I'm in Love (shown on March 23, 2011), and in October he returned in the primetime series Budoy (his first primetime television series without Chiu). He starred with Jessy Mendiola; Chiu had an adjacent time slot with her drama, My Binondo Girl with Xian Lim. In November 2011 Anderson made another film with Geronimo, Won't Last A Day Without You. He reunited in a movie with Chiu titled 24/7 in Love, Star Magic's ensemble film in view of the agency's 20th anniversary. He is starring as Miguel Dizon in the 2013 teleserye, Bukas Na Lang Kita Mamahalin alongside Dawn Zulueta and Kapamilya Leading Lady The Jewel of Drama Cristine Reyes.

Chalk Magazine's Top 50 Hottest Guys (2006-2008) and Number One Hokage (2013); Yes! Magazine's 100 Most Beautiful Stars (2007-2015, 2017), The Next Big Star (2011), and Top 20 Endorsers (2011); Candy Magazine's Top 3 Hottest Celebrity Cutie (2007) and Swoon-Worthiest Crushes (2008); Meg Magazine's Annual 50 Hottest Guys (2007, 2009–2010);  Star Studio Magazine's Number #1 (2008), Sexiest Stars (2011), and Top 25 Most Intriguing and Inspiring People (2012); Cosmo Men Magazine's Top 1 Cosmo Celebrity Centerfold (2009); Inside Showbiz's Top 40 Hottest Men (2012); and Metro Magazine's Hottest Leading Men (2013)

Basketball career
In May 2018, Anderson joined the Marikina Shoemasters in the Maharlika Pilipinas Basketball League. He also played for the team at the Chooks-to-Go Pilipinas 3x3, a three-on-three basketball league, debuting in the third tour of the 2019 President's Cup helping the team win their first game in the conference. They won over the 1Bataan Risers but was not able to clinch a win for the remaining of the third tour. He later joined Imus Bandera for the following season. After suiting up for Imus, Anderson joined the GenSan Warriors, a team based in General Santos which is also his hometown

Filmography

Film

Television

Music videos
 "Love Team" - Itchyworms, Noontime Show (2006)
 "Crazy Love" - Kim Chiu, Gwa Ay Di (2007)
 "Your Name" - Young JV, Doin' It Big (2012)
 "Pinoy Summer, Da Best Forever" - Gerald Anderson and Sarah Geronimo (2012)
 "Step No, Step Yes" - Enchong Dee, Chinito Problems (2014)

Discography

Dance albums
 Gerald's Dance Pick (2006) 
 Gerald's Noodle Dance (2007)

ABS-CBN's Station ID Appearance

Awards and honors

Performance awards

Personality Awards

References

External links

1989 births
Living people
21st-century Filipino male actors
ABS-CBN personalities
Basketball players from Quezon City
Male models from Texas
Filipino male child actors
Filipino male film actors
Filipino male models
Filipino male television actors
Filipino men's basketball players
Filipino people of American descent
Maharlika Pilipinas Basketball League players
People from General Santos
People from Zambales
Pinoy Big Brother contestants
Star Magic personalities
Viva Artists Agency